Comedy Ka Maha Muqabala is a comedy reality show that aired on Star Plus. Four teams including some of the biggest names from films and television competed, and the show was hosted by Jennifer Winget. Comedy Ka Maha Muqabala was launched on 19 March 2011 and was produced by Reliance BIG Entertainment. The show ended on 11 June 2011 after a grand finale episode. The winners were, Shreyas Chi Mandli group.

Plot
Each week, four teams competed against each other in a comedy competition. The teams were captained by four Indian comedy celebrities—Arshad Warsi, Raveena Tandon, Shekhar Suman and Shreyas Talpade—who performed with a team of television celebrities, stand-up comedians and one comedy beginner in a variety of challenges. A total of 20 contestants competed. Based on their performances, teams were scored by the audience and other team captains. The team with the highest scores at the end of the week won the "Comedy Ka.

Teams

Over the course of the competition, Sudesh Bhosle replaced Sudesh Lehri, Sucheta Khanna replaced Aashka Goradia and Rajesh Kumar replaced Arhaan Behl.

Format

Each week included two or more rounds.  The stand-up round, included in early episodes, featured one member of each team performing a stand-up routine, and was worth 20 points.  The team round featured two or more team members performing together, also worth twenty points.  A challenge round introduced in later episodes also featured two or more team members performing together, with the best performance earning ten bonus points.  The Tug of War (ToW) round, featured in later episodes, included one member from each team performing together on a skit, with the top individual performer receiving five points for the team.

For the stand-up and team rounds, each team could earn up to 10 points from the audience and up to 10 more points from the three non-performing captains.

Weekly scores

Highest Scoring Team
Lowest Scoring Team

Week 1

In the first week of competition, each round was worth a maximum of 40 points. Raju Shrivastav received a perfect score of 40.

Week 2

In the second week, both rounds were reduced to 20 points.

Week 3

Sudesh Bhosle replaced Sudesh Lehri from Raveena Ke Mohre in the third week. Due to the airing of the Star Parivaar Awards 2011 no episode was telecast on 3 April 2011. The format was changed this week to account for the single episode.  In the team round, the top-scoring team could earn 10 additional bonus points.  Arshad and Shreyas teams tied, so each received 5 bonus points. In the stand-up round, a duel was set up where two individuals would go head to head, performing on a theme, with the winner receiving all 20 points. The line-ups were Rehman vs Shailesh and Raju vs Sudesh.

Week 4

Sucheta Khanna replaced Aashka Goradia from Raveena Ke Mohre in the fourth week. Arshad Ke Punters scored the most points, but Shreyas Chi Mandli finished the week with the highest cumulative score of 189.

Week 5

Rajesh Kumar replaced Arhaan Behl from Shreyas Chi Mandli in week five.  The stand-up round was incomplete this week and thus was not included in the scoring.

Week 6

Week 7

Nikhil Ratnaparkhi won the "Best performer of the week" award in week seven.

Week 8

In the eighth week, the challenge round was worth 50 points rather than 10, and Raveena Ke Mohre were eliminated.

Week 9

The ninth week was the first for the Tug of War (ToW) round, deciding the performer of the week and giving the winning team an opportunity to earn an additional five bonus points. Cumulative point totals were also reset this week.

Week 10

The Tug of War (ToW) round was conducted twice in the tenth week, once for women and once for men.

Week 11/12 - Semi Final

In the semi-final, Shekhar Ke Movers and Arshad Ke Punters first competed in two rounds. Arshad Ke Punters then competed against Shreyas Chi Mandli and won a place in the finals. Shreyas Chi Mandli finally battled Shekhar Ke Movers in two more elimination rounds, and Shekhar Ke Movers was eliminated.

Week 13 - Grand Finale

After two team rounds, Shreyas Chi Mandli won the competition.

Scores Summary

Winner of the Week(Sartaj)
Team Eliminated

Scores shown in the above table are based on the total tally from week 1 until end of that week.

External links
Watch full episodes of the show: http://starplus.startv.in/video/showvideo.asp?showid=196&view_type=rated&sid=114
Show related news stories: http://starplus.startv.in/comedy-ka-maha-muquabala/shownews.aspx

References

StarPlus original programming
Indian reality television series
Indian stand-up comedy television series
2011 Indian television series endings